Dirina badia is a species of crustose lichen in the family Roccellaceae. It is found on the small desert mountains of northern Peru, where it grows on both stone and on bark.

Taxonomy
The lichen was formally described as a new species in 1983 by Anders Tehler, as a species of Roccellina. Tehler and Damien Ertz transferred it to the genus Dirina in 2013 based on the results of both molecular phylogenetic analysis and more thorough microscopic investigations.

Description
The lichen has creamy-brown to brown, crustose thallus (0.1–1.5 mm thick) with a somewhat roughened surface texture, and a chalk-like medulla. The ascospores are 27–33 by 4–5 μm. The expected results of chemical spot tests are C+ (red) on the thallus surface, C– on the medulla, and C+ (red) on the apothecial disc. Dirina badia contains erythrin, lecanoric acid, and a couple of other unidentified substances as lichen products.

Habitat and distribution
The range of Dirina badia is restricted to northern Peru, where it is common on the small desert mountains. It is typically saxicolous, growing on acidic rock, but it has also been recorded growing on the bark of shrubs and small trees.

References

badia
Lichen species
Lichens described in 1983
Lichens of Peru